Mathurin Crucy (2 February 1749, Nantes - 7 November 1826, Chantenay, near Nantes) was a French architect and urban planner, who conceived a major Neo-Classical architectural programme for Nantes.

Life 

The son of a lumber contractor, Crucy trained as an architect in Nantes in the studio of Jean-Baptiste Ceineray. With his help, he went to Paris and met the architect Étienne-Louis Boullée and the painter Joseph-Marie Vien. These contacts helped him to join the Académie royale d'architecture in 1771. He won the first Academy Award in 1774, later called the Prix de Rome, for his plan for a public spa-water bath. This allowed him to make a living in Italy for four years. At the Villa Medici, he met the painter Jacques-Louis David. He became deeply influenced by the villas of the architect Andrea Palladio.

He returned to Nantes in 1779 and succeeded Ceineray as overseer of the town architecture in 1780. He was responsible for the management of large urban developments underway at the time, including the transformation of the districts of Graslin and la Bourse. He originated the planning of Place Graslin and designed the Théâtre Graslin and Palais de la Bourse.

During the French Revolution he sought to protect important monuments from destruction by revolutionary extremists. He saved the tomb of Duke Francis II of Brittany and Marguerite de Foix during the destruction of the Carmelite church in the ducal parish in 1793. The tomb was later re-erected in Nantes cathedral.

He resigned in 1800 to devote himself to the family business, a naval shipyard, with his brother Louis. The business was growing because of the wars with England. His company, based in Basse-Indre, built frigates for the Napoleonic fleet, but it went bankrupt in 1808 and he completely abandoned this activity in 1810. He was appointed architect of the department of Loire-inférieure in 1809.

In 1808, he was asked by the sculptor François-Frédéric Lemot (1771–1827) to create a landscaped area of Italian inspiration in the town of Gétigné (near Clisson). It is currently known as Domaine de la Garenne Lemot. He started building the park and built the maison du jardinier de la Garenne between 1811 and 1815, one of the masterpieces of architecture in the rustic Italian style in France. He quarrelled with Lemot in 1821 and never finished the project, which was left to his successor, Pierre-Louis Van Cleemputte.

His niece, Justine Crucy, married Louis-Prudent Douillard, an architect, in 1821 and in 1823, another niece, Zita Crucy, married Louis-Prudent's brother Constant, an architect too, who designed some of the hospitals of Loire-inférieure, notably St. Jacques General Hospital in Nantes, and the place du Sanitat in the same town. Justine and Zita were daughters to Louis Crucy (born 1756), Mathurin's brother. On the 4 October 1785, in the Saint Similien church in Nantes, Louis and Mathurin Crucy had themselves married sisters Le Roux, Françoise and Marie Françoise.

Main projects 

 1780–88 : Place Graslin
 1783 : Hôtel de Montaudoin or Hôtel des Colonnes, on what is now Place du Maréchal-Foch
 1784–88 :  Théâtre Graslin at Nantes
 1787 : Place Royale (destroyed in the Second World War and rebuilt more grandly on the same model)
 1787 : Cathédrale de Rennes (built after the old building was demolished as it threatened to fall down)
 1789 : Halle aux blés (demolished 1882)
 1791 : Cours Cambronne (plans, completed during the 19th century)
 1802 : Public baths (demolished) and west quays of the Île Feydeau
 1807 : Halle aux poissons (demolished 1851)
 1808 : Bourse du commerce, Nantes
 1811–15 : Maison du jardinier du domaine de la Garenne Lemot, communes of Gétigné and Cugand, near Clisson
 1818–23 : Garden structures in the Garenne-Lemot (temple of friendship, column, obelisk)
 1816 : start of works on the house of the master of the Garenne-Lemot, to plans by Crucy (abandoned in 1823)

Notes

Bibliography 
  Claude Cosneau, Mathurin Crucy, 1749–1826, architecte nantais néoclassique, exhibition catalogue, Musée Dobrée, Nantes, 1986, 154 p. Compte-rendu in Revue de l'art n°74, 1986
  Alain Delaval, Le Théâtre Graslin à Nantes, ed. Joca Seria
  E. Maillard, L'Art à Nantes au XIXe siècle, ed. Vier, 1891, pp. 182–183
  Daniel Rabreau, "Mathurin Crucy", Dictionnaire des architectes, ed. Encyclopaedia Universalis - Albin Michel, 1999, pp. 193–194

See also 
 Théâtre Graslin
 Palais de la Bourse

External links
 Page for Crucy on Structurae
 Biography on the site of the Archives municipales de Nantes 

1749 births
1826 deaths
Architects from Nantes
18th-century French architects
19th-century French architects
French urban planners
Architects of cathedrals
Theatre architects
French neoclassical architects
Prix de Rome for architecture